The Hansa-Brandenburg CC was a single-seat German fighter flying boat of World War I. It was used by both the Kaiserliche Marine (Imperial German Navy) and the Austro-Hungarian Navy.

Development and design 
The Hansa-Brandenburg CC (where the designation CC came from the initials of the financier of the Hansa Brandenburg works, Camillo Castiglioni) was designed by Ernst Heinkel during 1916 for use by the Austro-Hungarian Navy. It was a single engined, single seater flying boat, with a pusher engine mounted between the wings. It had single-bay wings, with the unusual "Star-Strutter" arrangement of bracing struts (where four Vee struts joined in the centre of the wing bay to result in a "star" arrangement) shared with the Hansa-Brandenburg D.I and the KDW.

The CC was purchased both by Austro-Hungary and the Imperial German Navy. The Austro-Hungarian aircraft were powered by 119 kW (160 hp) Austro-Daimler or 130 kW (180 hp) Hiero engines and armed by a single 8 mm (.315 in) Schwarzlose machine gun. The German aircraft were powered by 110 kW (150 hp) Benz Bz.III engines and armed with one or two lMG 08/15 machine guns.

One example was modified as a triplane, while a second aircraft was modified with sponsons replacing the outrigger floats in support of the development process for the Zeppelin-Lindau (Dornier) Rs.IV.

Triplane variant 
The triplane configuration was created from the standard model by inserting a third, short-span wing between the upper and lower planes of, at the point where the star struts crossed. Delivered to Austro-Hungary in the Spring of 1917, the sole example was written off that autumn following a landing accident.

Operational history 
Austro-Hungary received 37 Hansa Brandenburg CCs, using them to provide air defence for ports and naval bases along the Adriatic sea coast.

Germany received 36 aircraft from February 1917. They were temporarily grounded in July of that year because of severe vibration, being modified with additional interplane bracing struts.

Operators 

Kaiserliche und Königliche Kriegsmarine

Kaiserliche Marine

Specifications (CC Kaiserliche Marine)

See also

References

Bibliography 

Green, William and Swanborough, Gordon. The Complete Book of Fighters. New York: Smithmark, 1994. .

External links 

 Hansa Brandenburg (history, photos, three-view and paper model)
 Hansa-Brandenburg CC und W.18

CC
1910s German fighter aircraft
Flying boats
Biplanes
Single-engined pusher aircraft
Triplanes
Aircraft first flown in 1916